Eesti Kirjanike Kooperatiiv (Estonian Writers' Cooperative) was a publishing house in Lund, Sweden.

It was founded by members of the Estonian diaspora, mainly writers August Gailit, Bernard Kangro, Valev Uibopuu and Enn Vallak, in 1950 and existed until 1994.

Writers whose books were published: Artur Adson, August Gailit, Gert Helbemäe, Bernard Kangro, Albert Kivikas, August Mälk, Karl Ristikivi, Gustav Suits, Valev Uibopuu, Marie Under and Henrik Visnapuu.

See also
 Eesti Kirjastus Orto

References

 Janika Kronberg. "Tiibhobu märgi all. Eesti Kirjanike Kooperatiiv 1950–1994", Tallinn: Underi ja Tuglase Kirjanduskeskus 2002

External links
 ERR, digihoidla, Süda ei põle ära, film about Eesti Kirjanike Kooperatiiv, 1989
 Tiibhobu märgi all, sirp.ee, 2002

Estonian diaspora
Book publishing companies of Estonia